The Kerio Valley National Reserve is a protected area in the Kerio Valley, Kenya, a branch of the Great Rift Valley. The  reserve was created in 1983 and is managed by the Kenya Wildlife Service.

The isolated Kerio Valley lies between the Cherangani Hills and the Tugen Hills.
It has semi-tropical vegetation on the slopes, while the floor of the valley is covered by dry thorn bush.
The most comfortable time of the year is in July and August when the rains have ended and the temperatures are not excessive.

The reserve is on the west side of the crocodile-infested Kerio River, while the Lake Kamnarok National Reserve is on the east side. The reserve has dramatic scenery, and prolific birdlife. As of 2006 there were no fees and no facilities, although it was possible to camp in the bush beside Lake Kamnarok.
After the reserve was established there was an increase in the wildlife population, including elephants. These caused some damage to neighboring crops and beehives.
Most of the people here are Kalenjin herders.

References

Sources

National parks of Kenya
Protected areas established in 1983